TradeCard, Inc. was an American software company. Its main product, also called TradeCard, was a SaaS collaboration product that was designed to allow companies to manage their extended supply chains including tracking movement of goods and payments. TradeCard software helped to improve visibility, cash flow and margins for over 10,000 retailers and brands, factories and suppliers, and service providers (financial institutions, logistics service providers, customs brokers and agents) operating in 78 countries.

On January 7, 2013, TradeCard and GT Nexus announced plans to undergo a merger of equals, creating a global supply-chain management company that would employ about 1,000 people and serve about 20,000 businesses in industries including manufacturing, retail and pharmaceuticals. The combined company rebranded itself as GT Nexus.

History
TradeCard was founded in 1999 by Kurt Cavano as a privately owned firm.

In 2003, Warburg Pincus led three funding rounds, with TradeCard closing $10 million.

In 2010, Deloitte cited TradeCard for its entrepreneurial and disruptive cloud technology enterprise resource planning solution that provides new IT architectures designed to address unmet needs of enterprises.

In 2011, TradeCard's revenue grew by 36% over the previous year, and the company claimed on its website that it handled $25 billion in sourcing volume on its platform, by 10,000 organizations and 45,000 unique users.  In 2012, founder and CEO Kurt Cavano transitioned to the Chairman role and Sean Feeney was appointed CEO.

TradeCard was headquartered in New York City, with offices in San Francisco, Amsterdam, Hong Kong, Shenzhen, Shanghai, Taipei, Seoul, Colombo and Ho Chi Minh City.

Clients
TradeCard provided global supply chain and financial supply chain products to retail companies, factories and suppliers, and service providers (financial institutions, logistics service providers, customs brokers and agents).

Clients include retailers and brands such as Coach, Inc. Levi Strauss & Co., Columbia Sportswear, Guess, Rite Aid, and Perry Ellis International.

Awards
 2012 Best Platform Connecting Buyers, Suppliers and Financial Institutions by Global Finance
 2012 Supply and Demand Chain 100
 2012 Pros to Know by Supply and Demand Chain 
 2011 Top Innovator by Apparel Magazine 
 2011 Great Supply Chain Partner by SupplyChainBrain

References

External links 
 

Supply chain software companies
American companies established in 1999
Companies based in New York City
ERP software companies
Software distribution
As a service
Software industry
Cloud platforms
ERP software
Private equity portfolio companies
Business software companies
Warburg Pincus companies